General Sutherland may refer to:

Charles Sutherland (Surgeon General) (1831–1895), U.S. Army brigadier general
Fred Sutherland (Canadian Air Force General) (born 1942), Canadian Air Force lieutenant general
James W. Sutherland (1918–1987), U.S. Army lieutenant general
Richard K. Sutherland (1893–1966), U.S. Army lieutenant general